Primal Fear is a 1996 American legal thriller film directed by Gregory Hoblit, based on William Diehl's 1993 novel of the same name, and written by Steve Shagan and Ann Biderman. It stars Richard Gere, Laura Linney, John Mahoney, Alfre Woodard, Frances McDormand and Edward Norton in his film debut. The film revolves around a Chicago defense attorney who believes that his altar boy client is not guilty of killing an influential Catholic archbishop. 

The film was a box office success and received positive reviews, with Norton's breakthrough performance earning critical praise. He was nominated for an Academy Award for Best Supporting Actor and a BAFTA Award for Best Actor in a Supporting Role, and he won the Golden Globe Award for Best Supporting Actor – Motion Picture.

Plot
Martin Vail is an arrogant Chicago defense attorney who loves the spotlight and is known for winning acquittals for high-profile clients on legal technicalities.

One morning, Archbishop Rushman, a beloved figure and head of Chicago's Catholic diocese, is ambushed and savagely killed by an unseen assailant. Aaron Stampler, a 19-year-old altar boy from Kentucky, seen fleeing the scene covered in blood is arrested for the crime. Vail meets with Aaron in his holding cell and offers to defend him pro bono. Aaron reveals that he had admired the archbishop. Vail believes that Aaron is innocent, being meek and with a severe stutter. Meanwhile, Janet Venable is assigned by the state's attorney to prosecute the case.

Venable and Vail have a shared history. They previously worked together as state attorneys, and had a sexual relationship at that time. Vail tries to seduce her again at a public event the night before the murder, whispering into her ear from behind and asking her to dance, despite there being no music; she refuses him, declaring their past was "a six month long one night stand."

As the trial begins, Vail discovers that powerful civic leaders, including the corrupt state's attorney John Shaughnessy, recently lost millions in real-estate investments, due to Rushman's decision to not develop church-owned land. This is revealed by Vail's former client, Joey Piñero, who wants to protect the community from being displaced by high-end real estate development.

Following a tip from Alex, another former altar boy, about recorded evidence of the archbishop being a sexual predator, Vail steals a VHS cassette from the crime scene. The tape shows the archbishop forcing Aaron, Linda, and Alex to engage in sexual acts. When Vail confronts Aaron about lying, Aaron breaks down crying and suddenly becomes a violent sociopath without a stutter who self-identifies as Roy. Roy claims responsibility for the archbishop's death and attacks Vail. Soon after, he becomes passive and shy again, with no recollection of the personality switch.

Neuropsychologist Molly Arrington, investigates Aaron for several hours and concludes he has dissociative identity disorder caused by years of physical and sexual abuse at the hands of his father and Rushman. Vail is troubled by this information, because it proves his client is innocent by reason of insanity plea, but he can not change his defense in the midst of an ongoing trial. 

Vail decides to anonymously deliver the evidence to Venable's doorstep, knowing that she is under intense pressure to deliver a guilty verdict and will use the tape as proof of Aaron's motive, which she has so far been unable to establish. Venable knows Vail is using her to reveal the archbishop as a sexual predator and generate sympathy for Aaron. Venable's boss Shaughnessy commands her to destroy the evidence, but she refuses and introduces it in court.

Piñero is discovered murdered. Surprisingly, Vail calls Shaughnessy as a witness in Aaron's case, and exposes Shaughnessy on the stand as guilty of hiding previous evidence of the archbishop's sexual predation. Vail accuses Shaughnessy of resenting the archbishop for stopping the sixty million dollar land development deal, especially when the archbishop clearly owed Shaughnessy for hiding evidence, but Judge Shoat stops the line of questioning and fines Vail for using the court room as a stage for his own revenge.

Dr. Arrington testifies that Aaron's "body could be present at a homicide and yet his mind would be unable to recall it," but the judge dismisses her testimony as being too close to a plea of insanity.

Finally, Vail calls Aaron to the witness stand and questions him about the sexual abuse he suffered at Rushman's hands. While Aaron appears increasingly distressed, Vail surreptitiously covers the court microphone and threatens, "Stop your whining, little girl. Be a man," words he knows will trigger Aaron's memories of having been abused by his father.

Venable begins a challenging cross-examination, in which Aaron suddenly becomes Roy, screaming obscenities and death threats. He leaps at Venable and holds her hostage in a headlock, but is subdued and returned to his cell. 

The judge informs Vail and Venable that she intends to dismiss the jury in favor of a bench trial, and will declare Aaron not guilty by reason of insanity, remanding him to a psychiatric hospital. She warns Vail to be more professional in the future. 

Venable is fired for losing the case and for allowing Shaughnessy and Rushman's crimes to be publicly exposed. She confronts Vail for having used her. He admits he knew she was in potential danger during the cross-examination, but defends his choice. He then tries to use her vulnerability to resume their sexual relationship again, approaching her from behind and whispering into her ear, but Venable refuses him.

Vail visits Aaron in his cell to inform him of the dismissal. A shaky and dazed Aaron claims to have no recollection of his violent reaction in the courtroom, but joyfully expresses his gratitude to Vail: "You say- you say- you saved my life."

As Vail is leaving, Aaron asks him to convey an apology to Venable for the attack. Vail confronts Aaron for being able to remember what happened during the "Roy" blackout. No longer stuttering, Aaron confidently brags about contriving the multiple personality disorder, killing both Rushman and Linda, and manipulating Vail. Vail wonders aloud: "So there never...there never was a Roy." With contempt, the murderer corrects him: "There never was an Aaron." 

Vail leaves the courthouse, stunned and disillusioned, to the sound of the murderer's taunts echoing in the halls.

Cast

Several Chicago television news personalities made cameos as themselves as they deliver reports about the case, including WLS's Diann Burns and Linda Yu, WBBM-TV's Mary Ann Childers, Lester Holt and Jon Duncanson, and WGN-TV's Bob Jordan and Randy Salerno.

Soundtrack
The soundtrack includes the Portuguese fado song "Canção do Mar" sung by Dulce Pontes.

Release
Primal Fear was released on VHS and LaserDisc on October 15, 1996.

Reception
Review aggregation website Rotten Tomatoes reports an approval rating of 77% based on 47 reviews, with an average rating of 6.8/10. The site's critics consensus reads: "Primal Fear is a straightforward, yet entertaining thriller elevated by a crackerjack performance from Edward Norton." Metacritic, which uses a weighted average, lists the film with a weighted average score of 46/100 based on 18 critics, indicating "mixed or average reviews". Audiences surveyed by CinemaScore awarded the film an average grade of B+ on an A+-to-F scale.

Janet Maslin of The New York Times wrote that the film has a "good deal of surface charm" but "the story relies on an overload of tangential subplots to keep it looking busy." Roger Ebert of the Chicago Sun-Times awarded Primal Fear three and a half stars, writing that "the plot is as good as crime procedurals get, but the movie is really better than its plot because of the three-dimensional characters." Ebert described Gere's performance as one of the best in his career, praised Linney for rising above what might have been a stock character and applauded Norton for offering a "completely convincing" portrayal.

The film spent three weekends at the top of the U.S. box office.

Accolades
Norton's depiction of Aaron Stampler earned him multiple awards and nominations.

The film is recognized by American Film Institute in these lists:
 2003: AFI's 100 Years...100 Heroes and Villains:
 Aaron Stampler – Nominated Villain
 2008: AFI's 10 Top 10:
 Nominated Courtroom Drama Film

See also
 Mental illness in films
 Trial movies
 Plot twist 
 Deewangee (2002), a Hindi film influenced by Primal Fear.

References

External links

 
 
 
 
 
 

1996 films
1996 crime drama films
1996 crime thriller films
1996 directorial debut films
1996 drama films
1990s legal films
1990s psychological thriller films
1990s thriller drama films
American crime drama films
American crime thriller films
American legal drama films
American psychological thriller films
American thriller drama films
American courtroom films
Films about dissociative identity disorder
Films scored by James Newton Howard
Films about lawyers
Films about religion
Films based on American novels
Films based on crime novels
Films directed by Gregory Hoblit
Films featuring a Best Supporting Actor Golden Globe winning performance
Films set in Chicago
Films shot in Chicago
Films shot in West Virginia
Films produced by Gary Lucchesi
Legal thriller films
American neo-noir films
Paramount Pictures films
Rysher Entertainment films
Works about judgement
Courtroom dramas
1990s English-language films
1990s American films

ja:真実の行方#映画